Aditya Shastri (4 June 1963 – 24 May 2021) was an Indian academic. He was the vice-chancellor of Banasthali Vidyapith (Banasthali University), a private university located in the Tonk district of the Indian state of Rajasthan. He was dearly loved and respected among the students and thus, was always titled as 'Aditya Bhaiya'. He was the grandson of Hiralal Shastri, first chief minister of state of Rajasthan.

Biography 
Shastri completed his graduation from Birla Institute of Technology and Science, Pilani and went to the US for Masters from the State University of New York, Stony Brook. He completed his PhD from Massachusetts Institute of Technology (MIT) in 1990. Shastri was in the Governing Council of the Association of Indian Universities (AIU). He served for one year at the Tata Institute of Fundamental Research (TIFR). Later he moved to Banasthali where he has remained until his death.

He died due to post-COVID-19 effects on 24 May 2021, during the COVID-19 pandemic in India.

Works 
He has authored five textbooks and published over 50 research papers. He has generated more than US$10 million in grants for Banasthali.

References 

Academic staff of Banasthali Vidyapith
1963 births
20th-century Indian educational theorists
2021 deaths
Deaths from the COVID-19 pandemic in India
20th-century Indian educators
Heads of universities and colleges in India